Professional speaker may refer to:

 Keynote speaker
 Motivational speaker
 Public speaker
 Speaker (politics)
 Voice actor
 Professional loudspeaker

Notable persons 
 John J. Sweeney (professional speaker)

See also 
 Speaker (disambiguation)
 National Speakers Association
 Speakers bureau
 Speaking fee
 Association of Speakers Clubs
 Toastmasters International